Gulvand (also Romanized as Gūlvand and Goolvand; also known as Golband, Golvandeh, Gulband, and Gūlbeh) is a village in Kuh Sardeh Rural District, in the Central District of Malayer County, Hamadan Province, Iran. At the 2006 census, its population was 112, in 22 families.

References 

Populated places in Malayer County